Kristoffer  Klauß (born 29 June 1988), better known by the stage name Gzuz, is a German rapper, singer, songwriter and record producer. In addition to his solo career, he has had success as part of Hamburg hip hop crew 187 Strassenbande.

Biography 
After his parents divorced, Klauß grew up with his sister and his mother in Hamburg. He was fascinated by the people who earn their money in the streets. Klauß has been a member of  187 Strassenbande since 2006. The name Gzuz is an acronym for "Ghetto-Zeug unzensiert" (Ghetto stuff uncensored).

In October 2010 he was sentenced to three years and six months in prison for predatory theft. During his detention, the 187 street gang went on a Free Gzuz Tour in 2012 and sold Gzuz Merchandise, such as Free Gzuz T-shirts.

After his release in 2013 he took part in the Uprising Tour. In 2014 he released  the album High & hungrig together with Bonez MC, which entered the album charts in Germany at number 9.

His solo album Ebbe & Flut was released on 9 October 2015. This made it to number 2 in the album charts in Germany. On 27 May 2016 he released the album High & hungrig 2 together with Bonez MC. It entered the album charts at number 1 and reached Gold status.

Gzuz gained attention in America after Worldstar Hip Hop posted the video for his song “Was Hast Du Gedacht”. The music video went viral due to its extremely graphic and violent nature. Worldstar later posted the video for his song “Warum” as well.

Awards 
 HANS – Der Hamburger Musikpreis
 2016: in the category Song des Jahres for Ahnma with Beginner & Gentleman
 Preis für Popkultur
 2016: in the category Lieblingsvideo for Ahnma with Beginner & Gentleman
 Hiphop.de Awards / Juice-Awards
 2016: in the category Beste Punchline for "Cabrio: Check! Glas wird geext / Na klar gibt es Sex, weil ich parshippe jetzt!"

Discography

Albums
with 187 Strassenbande
(for details, see discography of 187 Strassenbande)
2009: 187 Strassenbande
2011: Der Sampler II
2015: Der Sampler III
2017: Sampler 4
2021: Sampler 5
Solo

Collaborative singles and other charted songs

References 

1988 births
Musicians from Hamburg
German rappers
Living people